Cephalopods exhibit various dermal structures on their mantles and other parts. These may take the form of conspicuous warts, cushions, papillae or scales, though in many species they are microscopic tubercles. The most elaborate forms are found among the oceanic squid of the order Teuthida.

Morphology and composition
Most cephalopod dermal structures take the form of tubercles, and these are the only cartilaginous dermal structures (the various "dermal cushions" being composed of other forms of connective tissue). All three main types of cartilage found in vertebrates are represented among the different squid species: hyaline, elastic and fibrocartilage. Tubercles of hyaline cartilage are primarily associated with cranchiid or glass squid.

The vast majority of cephalopod dermal structures have a thin, overlying epidermal layer, though this is often damaged or missing in captured specimens.

Other cephalopods with prominent dermal structures include: Brachioteuthis spp.; Galiteuthis glacialis (which has round tubercles); Histioteuthis meleagroteuthis and Histioteuthis miranda (tuberculate ridges); Mastigoteuthis danae (large tubercles in advanced paralarvae); Onykia aequatorialis, Onykia ingens, Onykia lonnbergii, and Onykia robsoni (irregular warts); Slosarczykovia circumantarctica (fibrous integumental net); and all members of the subfamily Cranchiinae (strips of cartilaginous tubercles in various arrangements). Among octopuses, Ocythoe tuberculata is noted for the tubercles and ridges on its mantle.

Function

Different cephalopod dermal structures are hypothesised to play roles in buoyancy, locomotion, and even pseudoskeletal support.

Buoyancy aid
Two fundamentally different buoyancy mechanisms associated with dermal structures have been proposed.

Buoyancy vest
The mantle of Cranchia scabra is covered in multi-pointed cartilaginous tubercles. An anti-predator function has been proposed in the past, but this is thought unlikely given the small size and transparent nature of the tubercles. The tubercles of this species are covered by a thin, epidermal sheath that is often lost during capture. It has been speculated that in the live animal the interstitial space is filled with a buoyant fluid (likely an ammonium chloride solution) and acts as a "buoyancy vest". The hard tubercles may serve to maintain the shape of this structure. It has been estimated that in a C. scabra measuring 10 cm in mantle length (ML), the buoyancy vest could contribute an additional 4% to the animal's total buoyant fluid (most of the remainder being located in the coelom), probably sufficient to achieve neutral buoyancy.

A similar mechanism may be utilised by the much larger Galiteuthis glacialis, which has a very similar combination of tubercles and overlying epidermal sheath.

Fluid-filled dermal cushions
The overlapping "scales" of Lepidoteuthis grimaldii are actually dermal cushions with a vacuolate internal structure that are continuous with a similarly vacuolate underlying layer of mantle tissue. Ammonium ions (NH4+) are present in the mantle of this species at a measured concentration of 172 mM. Structurally very similar (though non-overlapping) dermal cushions are found in Pholidoteuthis adami. It has been proposed that these two species achieve buoyancy by means of the fluid stored in their vacuolate dermal cushions and upper mantle layer. Given their spongy form, these cushions may also play a secondary protective role.

Drag reduction

The complex dermal structures of Pholidoteuthis massyae may play a role in reducing hydrodynamic drag. More specifically, they may be involved in maintaining laminar flow by preventing or delaying boundary layer separation along the mantle.

It is possible that a similar locomotory mechanism is present in Mastigoteuthis cordiformis and Mastigoteuthis hjorti, though the small size of the tubercles in these species may preclude such a function.

Pseudoskeletal support

In the cranchiids Leachia cyclura and Liocranchia reinhardti, the dermal tubercles are not distributed throughout the mantle but arranged in discrete cartilaginous bands. A role in buoyancy control is therefore unlikely. One possibility is that these rigid bands play a pseudoskeletal role, maintaining the shape of parts of the mantle during swimming contractions or providing attachment points for mantle muscles or visceral tissue (such as the septum covering the coelom).

The very dense tuberculate ridges found on the arms and dorsal mantle of Histioteuthis meleagroteuthis may similarly provide insertion points for muscles, and are probably most important in juvenile animals, which lack well-developed musculature. In the two other Histioteuthis species with tuberculate ridges—H. meleagroteuthis and H. miranda—these structures likely have the same function.

Unknown function
The mantle of Asperoteuthis acanthoderma is covered in minute, widely spaced tubercles of hyaline-like cartilage. In a 1990 study of dermal structures in squid, Clyde F. E. Roper and C. C. Lu wrote that they were "unable to suggest a function" for the tubercles of this species, but that due to their small size and spacing they were unlikely to be involved in buoyancy or locomotion.

References
 

Cephalopod zootomy
Skin anatomy